Ukteyevo (Üktäy) is a rural locality (a selo) in Ukteyevsky Selsoviet, Iglinsky District, Bashkortostan, Russia. The population was 397 as of 2010. There are 6 streets.

Geography 
Ukteyevo is located 16 km north of Iglino (the district's administrative centre) by road. Baygildino is the nearest rural locality.

References 

Rural localities in Iglinsky District